San Diego Mesa College (Mesa College or Mesa)  is a public community college in Clairemont Mesa in San Diego, California. It is part of the California Community Colleges and the San Diego Community College District.  It is the largest community college in the city of San Diego and the 16th largest community college in the state.

Community college education in San Diego began in 1914 when the Board of Education of the San Diego City Schools authorized post secondary classes for San Diego high school students. Classes opened with four faculty members serving 35 students. San Diego Mesa College first opened in 1964. Initially offering education to 1,800 students, it has grown to become one of the largest community colleges in California. Classes started at the 900 Building at nearby Stephen Watts Kearny High School in the Fall 1963 Semester while the college was being completed; classes at the college started in January 1964.

In 2016, Mesa College became one of the first 10 California community colleges to offer four-year, bachelor degrees.

Administration
The College is administered by the San Diego Community College District. Mesa is accredited by the Western Association of Schools and Colleges.

Academics

Courses are provided in general education, lower-division transfer programs, occupational and developmental education. Mesa has transfer agreements in place with most University of California and California State University schools.

The college newspaper, The Mesa Press, is run by journalism students and covers Mesa-related news.

The Mesa College Foundation offers scholarships to Mesa students. It awarded over $120,000 in scholarships to Mesa students in 2004.

The college offers one Bachelor's degree and many Associate degrees.

Campus

Almost all of the buildings at Mesa College have been renovated or rebuilt. Some parts of the campus are still under construction. The campus is generally divided into an upper and lower level with the Learning Resource Center overlooking the lower level.

Sports
The Merrill Douglas Stadium (named after the first Athletic Director at the college) provides a venue for the Olympians Football team. It is located to the east of the campus. The baseball field is located next to the stadium. South of the stadium, there is a swimming pool for aquatic sports. It is adjacent to the Tecolote Canyon Natural Park.

The college mascot is the Olympians. The football team has competed in the Pacific Coast Athletic Conference (CCCAA) since 1982 in every sport except for football where they have competed under the Central League in the Southern California Football Association.

Notable alumni

Tony Banks, former NFL quarterback. Played quarterback at Mesa from 1992–1993.
Annette Bening, actress
Darren Comeaux, former NFL Linebacker. Played at Mesa from 1978–1979.
Sam Daghles, current Jordanian national basketball team head coach & former Jordanian league basketball player. Played at Mesa from 1999–2001.    
Matt Kofler, former NFL quarterback and Head Coach of San Diego Mesa Olympians Football team 2006–2008. Played quarterback at Mesa from 1978–1979. 
Shlomo Lipetz, Israeli baseball player as well as Vice President of Programming and Music Director at City Winery in Manhattan. Played at Mesa from 1999–2000.
Mike Martz, former NFL Coordinator and Head Coach. Played Tight End at Mesa in 1969. Coached at Mesa in 1974, 1976, 1977.
Michelle Ozbun, Virologist and Professor
Rick Stephenson, a champion bodybuilder

References

External links 

California Community Colleges
Clairemont, San Diego
Universities and colleges in San Diego
Educational institutions established in 1964
1964 establishments in California
Schools accredited by the Western Association of Schools and Colleges
Two-year colleges in the United States